Dumb-Hounded is a 1943 American animated short film directed by Tex Avery and written by Rich Hogan. It was the first cartoon to feature Droopy. The film was released on March 20, 1943 by Metro-Goldwyn-Mayer.

Plot
A wolf escapes from Swing Swing Prison (a parody of Sing Sing Prison). Many bloodhounds are freed to search for him, but one of them, Droopy, remains behind, greets and informs the audience that he is the hero of the story. He initially moves very slowly, but he still quickly finds the wolf who tries to escape from Droopy throughout the picture. At one point, he even flees away from Droopy by boarding a taxi, a train, a ship, and an aircraft.  However, everywhere he flees, Droopy pops up and sarcastically greets the wolf.

Ultimately, Droopy ends the pointless chase by dropping a huge boulder on the wolf's head and crushing him. When Droopy receives his reward, he jumps about in complete enthusiasm, only to pause and inform the audience, "I'm happy".

Voice cast
Bill Thompson as Droopy
Frank Graham as Killer, Mayor (uncredited)

Crew
Directed by: Tex Avery
Written by: Rich Hogan
Animation: Ray Abrams, Preston Blair, Ed Love, Irven Spence
Character Design: Claude Smith
Layout: John Didrik Johnsen, Bernard Wolf
Backgrounds: John Didrik Johnsen
Film and Sound Editor: Fred McAlpin
Music: Scott Bradley
Co-Producer: William Hanna
Produced by: Fred Quimby

Legacy
 Northwest Hounded Police (1946) features Droopy and the Wolf character in a similar set-up. Again, the Wolf flees from Droopy, who keeps popping up in unexpected places.
 In the early 2000s a Cartoon Network short Thanks a Latté features Droopy and the Wolf character in a nearly-similar set-up; where he works at a coffee shop and forces a stingy wolf into giving him a tip when the wolf leaves the shop without paying for his latte.
 In 2020, Dumb Hounded was released and digitally restored on the Tex Avery Screwball Classics: Volume 1 Blu-Ray by Warner Archive.

References

External links
 

1943 animated films
1943 short films
1943 films
1940s American animated films
1940s animated short films
Droopy
Self-reflexive films
Films directed by Tex Avery
Metro-Goldwyn-Mayer animated short films
Films scored by Scott Bradley
Tex Avery's Big Bad Wolf films
Films produced by Fred Quimby
Films about prison escapes
Films set in New York (state)
Metro-Goldwyn-Mayer cartoon studio short films
1940s English-language films